During the mid-1980s the company FlowTex was established by Manfred Schmider and Klaus Kleiser, two businessmen based in the South-Western state of Baden-Wuerttemberg, with the purpose of constructing and operating machines for horizontal drilling. The business idea was profitable and successful as it allowed for the installation of cables and pipes without the need to dig up roads, which would have caused considerable traffic chaos and noise pollution. By the year 2000, the two men claimed to have sold more than 3000 machines, each for around 1.5 million Deutsche Marks.

Scandal

What started as a legal business with a viable model soon turned into large-scale fraud; in reality, FlowTex had only produced 181 machines that were sold multiple times, with the certificates and identification plates manipulated according to the scam. At one point, the same machine was paraded at various different fake construction sites to potential investors during the same inspection; it later emerged that they had moved the machine from one location to another during lunch breaks. Over a period of ten years or so, they secured loans worth more than two billion Euros for non-existent drilling systems and the scam is widely tipped as Germany’s largest ever prosecuted case of white-collar crime.

Sentencing and aftermath

The scam was aided by a network of co-conspirators that included family, friends and employees of the firm, but ultimately it was Schmider and Kleiser who paid the largest price for their crimes; they were both arrested in February 2000 on suspicion of fraud and tax evasion, four years after the authorities were allegedly first tipped off about the fraudulent business practices. This apparent lack of determination to follow up on the leads was allegedly partly due to concerns that such investigations would jeopardise jobs and compromise leading politicians who had courted the FlowTex directors as model businessmen. Also suspicious was the fact that the tax inspector assigned to FlowTex was a tennis partner of one of the FlowTex directors. However, to date there have been no indications that the FlowTex management or any politicians tried to directly influence the proceedings.

References

Financial scandals
Scandals in Germany
Defunct manufacturing companies of Germany
Drilling technology